In particle physics, the threshold energy for production of a particle is the minimum kinetic energy that must be imparted to one of a pair of particles in order for their collision to produce a given result. If the desired result is to produce a third particle then the threshold energy is greater than or equal to the rest energy of the desired particle. In most cases, since momentum is also conserved, the threshold energy is significantly greater than the rest energy of the desired particle.

The threshold energy should not be confused with the threshold displacement energy, which is the minimum energy needed to permanently displace an atom in a crystal to produce a crystal defect in radiation material science.

Example of pion creation
Consider the collision of a mobile proton with a stationary proton so that a  meson is produced: 

We can calculate the minimum energy that the moving proton must have in order to create a pion.
Transforming into the ZMF (Zero Momentum Frame or Center of Mass Frame) and assuming the outgoing particles have no KE (kinetic energy) when viewed in the ZMF, the conservation of energy equation is:

Rearranged to 

By assuming that the outgoing particles have no KE in the ZMF, we have effectively considered an inelastic collision in which the product particles move with a combined momentum equal to that of the incoming proton in the Lab Frame.

Our  terms in our expression will cancel, leaving us with:

Using relativistic velocity additions:

We know that  is equal to the speed of one proton as viewed in the ZMF, so we can re-write with :

So the energy of the proton must be  MeV.

Therefore, the minimum kinetic energy for the proton must be  MeV.

Example of antiproton creation
At higher energy, the same collision can produce an antiproton:

If one of the two initial protons is stationary, we find that the impinging proton must be given at least  of energy, that is, 5.63 GeV. On the other hand, if both protons are accelerated one towards the other (in a collider) with equal energies, then each needs to be given only  of energy.

A more general example 

Consider the case where a particle 1 with lab energy  (momentum )
and mass  impinges on a
target particle 2 at rest in the lab, i.e. with lab energy  and mass .
, i.e.

is then found by assuming that these three particles are at rest in the center of mass frame (symbols with
hat indicate quantities in the center of mass frame):

Here  is the total energy available in the center of mass frame.

Using ,   and 
 one derives that

References

http://galileo.phys.virginia.edu/classes/252/particle_creation.html

Energy (physics)
Particle physics